North Pole Radio is an American radio network specializing in Christmas music. The network, owned and operated by Broadcast Partners out of Seattle, Washington, operates as an Internet feed throughout the year and programs terrestrial radio stations during the Christmas and holiday season.

References

External links
North Pole Radio

American radio networks
Companies based in Seattle